Kinamycins are a group of bacterial polyketide secondary metabolites containing a diazo group.  Kinamycins are known for their cytotoxicity and are considered of interest for potential use in anti-cancer therapies.

Synthesis

In 2006 and 2007 the means to totally and enantioselectively synthesize kinamycins C, F, and J were discovered.  In 2010 a method was found to allow easier synthesis of these compounds in fewer steps, making research into their properties more feasible.

References

External links
EMBL-EBI listing—includes links to structural formula and other properties of group members kinamycin (CHEBI:48207)
 Description of Porco(2006) and Nicolaou(2007) synthesis on University of Pittsburgh site

Polyketide antibiotics
Diazo compounds
Nucleic acid inhibitor antibiotics